Nora binti Mohd Danish Hanif (born 7 March 1982) also known as Nora Danish is a Malaysian actress, singer, model, television personality and businesswoman.

Background 
Nora was born on 7 March 1982 to a parent of Arab and Burmese descent. She was educated at Convent National Secondary School in Kajang.

Career 
Her entertainment career started in 2004 when she first appeared in Hotlink Mysterious Girl ads.

She first gained attention in television when she starred a lead role in a comedy sitcom called Puteri. In 2013, Nora appeared in three Malay films Lagenda Budak Hostel, Mencari Cinta & 2 Kalimah.

In June 2014, Nora revealed a few sneak previews on her official Instagram account about her 2014 film Pengantin Malam co-starring Farid Kamil. She also starred with Shaheizy Sam in a blockbuster film Polis Evo.

Personal life 
Nora Danish was once married to a businessman Rizal Ashram, on 20 June 2006 but they divorced when she was 3 months pregnant in July 2008. They have a son.

On 30 March 2017, she remarried to Mohamed Nedim Datuk Seri Nazri Aziz who is the son of the UMNO BN politician, Nazri Aziz. She became the stepmother to his son from his first marriage which ended in a divorce in the year 2013. The couple has a son of their own in February 2018.

Filmography

Film

Television

Television series

Online drama

Telemovie

Music video

Discography

Awards and nominations

References

External links 
 
 

1982 births
Living people
Malaysian film actresses
Malaysian people of Malay descent
Malaysian people of Burmese descent
Malaysian people of Arab descent
Malaysian female models
Malaysian television presenters
People from Terengganu
21st-century Malaysian actresses
Malaysian women television presenters